WODN-LD is a low-power television station in Portage, Indiana, broadcasting locally on VHF channel 13 and with their transmitter located in the town of Ogden Dunes. WODN-LD is an affiliate of Deutsche Welle, a 24-hour German news network.

External links

Porter County, Indiana
ODN-LD
Television channels and stations established in 1990
1990 establishments in Indiana
Low-power television stations in the United States